Zigler is a Germanic surname. Notable people with the surname include:

Edward Zigler (1930–2019), American psychologist
Jack Zigler (born 1952), American surgeon
Sieglinda Zigler (1919–1986), Brazilian swimmer
Vivi Zigler, American television executive

English-language surnames